Nekromantik (stylized as NEKRomantik) is a 1987 West German horror exploitation film co-written and directed by Jörg Buttgereit. It is known to be frequently controversial, banned in a number of countries, and has become a cult film over the years due to its transgressive subject matter (including necrophilia) and audacious imagery.

Plot
The film opens at night, as a woman urinates on the grass by the side of the road. She pulls up her underwear, gets into a car driven by her husband, and they drive away. The couple lose their way in the dark and subsequently run off the road. The next day their corpses are discovered, the man inside the vehicle, the woman thrown from it and her body cut in two.

The film centers on Rob Schmadtke, the tragic hero, who works for "Joe's Cleaning Agency", a company that removes bodies from public areas and cleans up after traffic accidents. Their emblem is the Totenkopf symbol (skull and crossbones variant) within a pentagram. This job leaves him the opportunity to pursue his full-time hobby: necrophilia. He returns home from his job to his apartment and girlfriend Betty. He plays with his assortment of preserved human remains and watches television while Betty takes a bath in blood-laden water. Their apartment is decorated with centerfolds featuring models, pictures of famed killers, and jars containing human parts, which are preserved in formaldehyde.

Rob watches a televised interview of a psychiatrist who speaks on the topic of arachnophobia and ways to overcome phobias. Rob then enters a daydream of a young rabbit being caught on a farm and graphically slaughtered. It is implied that these are memories of his father killing "a beloved childhood pet". A scene of an autopsy on a human cadaver follows. Next, a man drinking beer and shooting at birds with his rifle accidentally kills a nearby gardener, then discards the corpse.

Rob returns to work and discovers his new obsession, the corpse of the unnamed gardener, which has been found rotting in a pond. During the removal process, Rob absconds with it. He excitedly returns home with this gift for his waiting wife. They immediately cut a steel pipe and put a condom over it so Betty will have a phallus to straddle during their ménage à trois. This is immediately followed by a scene of meat being fried.

Betty and Rob dine and converse while watching their new "toy" hang on the wall. Plates collect the fluids that drip out of the body. When Rob goes to work the next day, he is confronted by his co-workers, who are tired of his habitual tardiness and the stinking suit festering in his locker. His foreman Bruno (Harald Lundt), who never liked him, bullies him as they climb the stairs to see the boss. Rob is fired on the spot.

At the apartment, Betty reads a love story to the corpse. She asks the corpse if it could feel the love in the story and begins to straddle the face of the corpse. When Rob returns, he informs Betty of his termination and she berates him for his failure as well as the fact that he did not stand up for himself. Betty soon leaves and takes the corpse with her. In a violent outburst, he kills their cat and bathes with its blood and entrails in the tub while the animal's body hangs over the tub. He then leaves to go to see a horror film. After being bullied by a fellow movie-goer, Rob leaves to go back to his apartment, visibly despondent.

Rob attempts suicide with pills and whiskey. He begins to drift into a dream in which he emerges from a garbage bag in a partially decayed state. He is soon greeted by a woman in white who gives him a corpse's head and they begin to dance, tossing the head and entrails back and forth. Once he wakes up, he leaves his apartment and hires a prostitute. They go to a cemetery, where he hopes the environment will help satisfy his libido, but he fails to perform sexually. When the prostitute mocks him, he strangles her and then rapes her corpse. He is startled as he awakes beside her with an old gardener standing over them. Rob grabs the man's shovel, chops his head off, and runs away.

The film closes with Rob's grisly suicide, in which he stabs himself while ejaculating. This scene is filled with flashbacks to the rabbit slaughter seen earlier in the film, but in reverse. In the final scene, a woman starts digging up Rob's grave. Only her foot is seen, in stockings and high heels.

Production

Development
Buttgereit had previously directed featurettes in Super 8 format, but this was his first feature-length film. Buttgereit and co-writer Franz Rodenkirchen conceived the basic concept of the film while discussing the relationship between love, sex, and death. The idea to connect an orgasm to the moment of death, somebody actually enjoying his own death, was part of their initial ideas.

Filming
The film was a no budget film, with inexpensive special effects. The film makes use of actual animal intestines and the eyeballs of pigs. The rabbit-related scene used documentary-style footage of a professional rabbit breeder at work.

Music
The original musical score for the film was composed by Hermann Kopp, Bernd Daktari Lorenz and John Boy Walton.

Analysis
According to Bartlomiej Paszylk, the film revealed its roots in amateur film techniques through use of poor acting and inferior cinematography. What actually made it a "must-see" for horror fans were its taboo-breaking scenes and dwelling in filthy, disgusting subjects. According to Kris Vander Lugt, in terms of genre Nekromantik is a mix of elements from several genres: splatter film, "schlock" film, black comedy, exploitation film, and softcore pornography. The title itself implies a mix of death (necro-) and romance. The film then serves as both an ode to necrophilia and an attack on the perceptions of morality of the bourgeoisie.

Other than his hobby of collecting specimens from corpses, Rob is depicted as a typical member of the German working class. On the other hand, the company which employs him has fascist allusions in its naming and emblem. When Rob loses his job, his romance with Betty also ends. She berates him for his lack of both money and manliness. Then she abandons him, introducing the themes of emotional and financial impotence.

Several times in the film, the exterior of the apartment of Rob and Betty is depicted from a streetview. This unexceptional exterior is contrasted with the grotesque scenes taking place behind its walls. Linnie Blake argues this is an evocation of the uncanny in Freudian terms. Rob owns a miniature version of The Glass Man. Created in 1930 by Franz Tschackert, it was a life-sized model of a male figure with transparent skin, making visible the skeleton and several internal organs. The placement of this artifact, along with specimen jars in the apartment, makes it seem like a  mad scientist's laboratory.

Linnie Blake finds it telling that the murderer of the young gardener is previously seen shooting at birds, and is so similar to characters from the Heimatfilms. This was an essentially conservative West German genre which depicted "morally unimpeachable family and community lives". She argues that Buttgereit both evokes and derides this genre, and by implication the culture which produced it. The supposedly upstanding member of society kills, hides a corpse, and then disappears from view, getting away with murder.

The film includes several occasions of a dream sequence, such as Rob's visions of a woman in white in a rural landscape. She transports a severed head in a box and later plays with it.

The film within a film is a slasher film. While a knife-wielding killer traces his knife across a female victim, the desensitized audience of the movie theater seems bored. They kiss or fondle each other, they eat or talk during a misogynist torture scene, a testament to their lack of empathy.

The suicide scene is a depiction of extreme masochism, but it also concludes the story of the character's sexual dysfunction, existential crisis, and social isolation. Rob is not only a person with a fetish of the dead, but one who constantly fails in his relationships with the living.

Release
NEKRomantik defied the censorship standards of West Germany. Since 1984, all horror films released in West Germany have been edited to remove violent scenes, both in cinema release and video release (such as with the 1985 film Day of the Dead), while a total of 32 films were banned from release in any format, including The Texas Chain Saw Massacre (1974), Mother's Day (1980), and The Evil Dead (1981). The creators of Nekromantik did not submit the film for review by the Freiwillige Selbstkontrolle der Filmwirtschaft and made the film available exclusively to an adult audience.

Home media
The film was released on Blu-ray by Cult Films on a limited run of 10,000 copies on 7 October 2014.

Reception

The film has had a polarised reception since the time of its release. It currently holds a 50% on Rotten Tomatoes.

The film critics of Berlin were typically favourable to the film, commenting on its taboo-breaking, its artistic merit, and the quality of its special effects. A magazine article on Sex and Death in the Modern Gay Cinema perceived a film as an allegory for AIDS and the necessity of safe sex.

The film initially faced no significant reprisals. It was only the scandal over the sequel Nekromantik 2 (1991) which caused the German authorities to temporarily ban sales by mail order of the original film.

John Waters proclaimed Nekromantik "the first ever erotic film for necrophiliacs".

Controversy
The film is currently banned outright in Iceland, Malaysia, Singapore, and the provinces of Nova Scotia and Ontario in Canada. In 1992, the Australian Classification Board banned the film outright in Australia due to "graphic necrophilia content". In 1993, the film was banned in Finland. The film was banned outright by the New Zealand Office of Film and Literature Classification in 1999 due to "revolting, objectionable content (necrophilia, high impact violence, animal cruelty and abhorrent behavior)". The film is banned in a number of other countries as well. In 2014, the British Board of Film Classification passed the film uncut with an 18 certificate.

Legacy

The film spawned a sequel three years later, Nekromantik 2, by the same director. Beatrice Manowski reprised her role as Betty in a short cameo.

Norwegian black metal band Carpathian Forest covered the film's opening theme in their album Strange Old Brew.

Danish psychobilly band Nekromantix is named after the film.

References

Bibliography

External links
 
 
 http://www.cultepics.com/product-detail/nekromantik/

1987 films
1987 horror films
Fiction about animal cruelty
Films directed by Jörg Buttgereit
Films set in a movie theatre
Films set in West Germany
Films shot in Germany
German horror films
1980s German-language films
Necrophilia in film
West German films
Obscenity controversies in film
Film controversies in Norway
Film controversies in Iceland
Film controversies in Malaysia
Film controversies in Singapore
Film controversies in Finland
Film controversies in Canada
Film controversies in Australia
Film censorship in Norway
Film censorship in Iceland
Film censorship in Malaysia
Film censorship in Singapore
Film censorship in Finland
Film censorship in Canada
Film censorship in Australia
1980s German films